Son Ho-jun (born 3 July 2002) is a South Korean footballer who plays as a forward for K League 1 Jeonnam Dragons, on loan from Suwon Samsung Bluewings.

References

2002 births
Living people
South Korean footballers
South Korea youth international footballers
Association football forwards
Suwon Samsung Bluewings players